Rock End is a 1937 novel by F. J. Thwaites. It was his tenth novel and was published by his own company.

References

External links
Rock End at AustLit

1937 Australian novels